Venezia is a planned metro station on Line C of the Rome Metro system. Part of the third phase of the line its opening is not yet determined. The abandoned Line D was supposed to intersect Line C at Venezia metro station.

Location
Venezia station will be located underneath the Piazza Venezia, a large square in Pigna, rione IX of Rome. Upon its completion, it will be the closest station to the Monument to Vittorio Emanuele II, Roman Forum and Capitoline Hill.

History
In 2009, as part of preliminary works for the station, a series of archaeological excavations were carried out. During these digs, archaeologists unearthed the remains of Emperor Hadrian's Athenaeum.

References

External links
 Official Line C site

Rome Metro Line C stations